Karin Schulze ( Rüger; born 1 April 1944) is a retired German track and field athlete who specialized in high jump. She competed in the 1964 and 1968 Summer Olympics and finished ninth and seventh, respectively.

At the East German championships, she won bronze medals in 1964 and 1965 and the silver in 1968. She also became East German indoor champion in 1964 and 1971. She competed for the sports clubs SC DHfK Leipzig and SC Leipzig.

Between 1965 and 1968 she married Jens Schulze, also a competitive high jumper, and changer her name from Rüger to Rüger-Schulze. They had three children, all athletes: Thomas specialized in shot put, whereas Michael and Sabina Schulze became swimmers. Sabina won a gold medal at the 1988 Summer Olympics.

References

1944 births
Living people
People from Wernigerode
Olympic athletes of the United Team of Germany
Olympic athletes of East Germany
Athletes (track and field) at the 1964 Summer Olympics
Athletes (track and field) at the 1968 Summer Olympics
East German female high jumpers
SC DHfK Leipzig athletes
SC Leipzig athletes
Sportspeople from Saxony-Anhalt